"Backwash" is the seventh episode of the second season of the HBO original series The Wire. The episode was written by Rafael Alvarez from a story by David Simon & Rafael Alvarez and was directed by Thomas J. Wright. It originally aired on July 13, 2003.

Plot

Bunk and Beadie meet with Landsman to discuss using a computer to monitor dock traffic. He is initially outraged but is more accepting when he learns that Daniels has granted them space in his detail's off-site location. Before storming out, he speculates that Daniels might take the Jane Doe case, which would relieve Homicide of the uncleared murders. Rawls later tries to persuade Daniels to take the Jane Does, but Daniels stands firm. Later, in an argument with Marla, Daniels defends his decision to stay in the BPD and tells her he is "playing their game" from now on.

Greggs and Prez follow up on the information from Shardene's friend, and find a strip club employing Eastern European dancers. They watch as the girls leave the club and file into a van, which they follow to an apartment building. Meanwhile, Herc and Carver borrow an expensive surveillance bug to get information on the portside drug trade, allowing the clerk to hold Carver's credit card as collateral. They place the bug in a tennis ball and have some success monitoring Frog. However, when Nick arrives, Frog distractedly tosses the ball into the busy street, where it is demolished by a Mack truck. Herc and Carver later plan to fraudulently claim to work with an informant to recoup the cost of the bug.

Beadie and Freamon continue to monitor drug trafficking through the port. When they note that Horseface will be working a ship, they call in Greggs and Prez for help with surveillance. Soon enough, Beadie sees him "lose" a container, which they follow back to an east side warehouse. There, they photograph Serge meeting with Proposition Joe. Meanwhile, McNulty tries to rekindle his relationship with Elena, who admits she can never trust him again. The detail persuades Daniels to take on the Jane Doe murders in order to make their investigation a success. Daniels informs Rawls that he's willing to take on the case in exchange for Rawls' full support. However, Marla expresses anger and disappointment that Daniels has abandoned his career ambitions.

Nick sets himself up as a supplier to Frog and gives Ziggy his share of the first drug profits. Frank attends a seminar on robotic dock technology and is appalled when he realizes the automated systems threaten to make stevedores obsolete. He pleads with Nat to let him extend his term as union treasurer for another year. Frank also confronts the union's lobbyist, Bruce DiBiago, and expresses his frustration that his lobbying efforts have failed to make political headway. Frank rants about his family's lack of a financially secure future and demands that Bruce work the politicians harder to get the canal dredged. After a stevedore named New Charles suffers a severe leg injury on the job, Frank delivers an envelope stuffed with cash to his family. Nat pointedly asks where the money comes from. Refusing to answer, Frank walks away.

Bodie buys a floral arrangement for D'Angelo's funeral and orders it to look like the tower he controlled before his demotion. Stringer visits Brianna's house for D'Angelo's wake and finds her inconsolable. In prison, Avon and Wee-Bey discuss D'Angelo's "suicide," unaware that Stringer engineered the murder. Despite being despondent, Avon musters enough anger to dismiss D'Angelo as weak for killing himself. After the funeral, Joe approaches Stringer to discuss sharing his supply for a share in the Barksdales' territory. Stringer pragmatically agrees to present the idea to Avon during his next visit. When he does so, Avon angrily dismisses it out of hand.

Production

Title reference
The title is a literary reference to the concept that D'Angelo discusses in the prison book club in "All Prologue".

One of several definitions for "backwash" is "a condition, usually undesirable, that continues long after the event which caused it".

Epigraph

Horseface makes this statement to the recently severely injured New Charles while the stevedores wait for the ambulance.

Non-fiction elements
The face on the dartboard in Frank's office is that of Robert Irsay, the owner of the former Baltimore Colts, who, in 1984, took the team to Indianapolis.

Nick has Guided by Voices, Disturbed, Filter, Bonnie "Prince" Billy and Static-X posters in his room.

Music
 The singer at D'Angelo's funeral sings "Jesus on the Mainline"
 The song playing repeatedly on the bar jukebox when Ziggy and Nick are talking about a supposed paternity suit against Ziggy is "Love Child" by Diana Ross & the Supremes.

Credits
Although credited, Paul Ben-Victor does not appear in this episode. Also, due to D'Angelo Barksdale having been killed off, Larry Gilliard, Jr. is no longer credited.

Guest stars
Seth Gilliam as Detective Ellis Carver
Domenick Lombardozzi as Detective Thomas "Herc" Hauk
Jim True-Frost as Detective Roland "Prez" Pryzbylewski
James Ransone as Ziggy Sobotka
Pablo Schreiber as Nick Sobotka
Callie Thorne as Elena McNulty
J.D. Williams as Preston "Boadie" Broadus
Hassan Johnson as Roland "Wee-Bey" Brice
Kristin Proctor as Aimee
Michael Hyatt as Brianna Barksdale
Robert F. Chew as Proposition Joe
Maria Broom as Marla Daniels
Lance Irwin as Maui
Delaney Williams as Sergeant Jay Landsman
Shamyl Brown as Donette
Keith Flippen as Bruce DiBiago (as "Keith Flippan")
Gary "D.Reign" as Frog
Tray Chaney as Malik "Poot" Carr
Luray Cooper as Nat Coxson
Charley Scalies as Thomas "Horseface" Pakusa
Stan Stewart as New Charles

Uncredited appearances
Richard Burton as Sean "Shamrock" McGinty
Richard Pelzman as Little Big Roy
Kelvin Davis as La La
Chris Ashworth as Sergei Malatov
Ted Feldman as George "Double G" Glekas
Jeffrey Pratt Gordon as Johnny "Fifty" Spamanto
Curtis L. McClarin as florist
Jacques Derosena as Leech
Randall Boffman as Bill Anderson - administrator for the port of Baltimore

References

External links
"Backwash" at HBO.com

The Wire (season 2) episodes
2003 American television episodes
Television episodes about funerals